The Abduction of the Sabine Women may refer to:

 The Abduction of the Sabine Women (1928 film), a German silent comedy film
 The Abduction of the Sabine Women (1936 film), a German comedy film
 The Abduction of the Sabine Women (1954 film), a West German musical comedy film

See also
 The Rape of the Sabine Women (disambiguation)